Commitment to Change was a centre-right political party in Argentina, principally active in the City of Buenos Aires.

History
The party was led by Mauricio Macri, businessman and chairman of Boca Juniors football club. The party was conceived as a source for new politicians, as the major parties were discredited after the December 2001 riots in Argentina. It has been active since he stood to be Mayor of Buenos Aires in 2003. He won the first round but lost the runoff election with 47% of the popular vote to Aníbal Ibarra. The party did however win a large number of members of the city legislature.

In 2003 Commitment to Change also won five seats in the Argentine Chamber of Deputies, the lower house of the Argentine Congress. In 2005 the party teamed up with the centre-right party of Ricardo López Murphy, Recreate for Growth, principally active in Buenos Aires Province. The new alliance was named Republican Proposal or usually PRO. The front won nine deputies in the 2005 legislative elections. Macri became a deputy in 2005.

Ahead of the 2007 elections, Macri and López Murphy have been in discussions with Jorge Sobisch, governor of Neuquén Province and likely presidential candidate in 2007, to create a nationwide centre-right political force. López Murphy has fallen out with Sobisch. Macri withdrew his support to Sobisch after the scandal of the death of the teacher Fuentealba during a demonstration in Neuquen.

On 2 April 2008, Commitment to Change replaced its name to Republican Proposal. A year later, Recreate for Growth was absorbed by Republican Proposal.

References

External links
Official site

Provincial political parties in Argentina
Liberal conservative parties in Argentina
Defunct political parties in Argentina
Political parties established in 2003
2003 establishments in Argentina
Political parties disestablished in 2008
2008 disestablishments in Argentina